The Puerto Rico men's national field hockey team represents Puerto Rico in men's international field hockey competitions and is controlled by the Puerto Rican Hockey Federation, the governing body for field hockey in Puerto Rico.

They have participated once at the Pan American Games in 1979 when they finished in last and tenth place.

Tournament record

Pan American Games
1979 – 10th place

Pan American Cup
2000 – 6th place
2004 – 8th place

Central American and Caribbean Games
1982 – 6th place
1986 – 6th place
1993 – 7th place
1998 – 5th place
2002 – 5th place
2006 – 7th place
2010 – 6th place
 2023 – Qualified

Pan American Challenge
2015 – 6th place

FIH Hockey Series
2018–19 – First round

See also
Puerto Rico women's national field hockey team

References

Americas men's national field hockey teams
National team
Field hockey